Datin Paduka Chew Mei Fun (born 17 October 1964) is a Malaysian politician who was the Secretary-General of the Malaysian Chinese Association (MCA). She is a former two-term Member of Parliament (MP) of Malaysia for Petaling Jaya Utara from 1999 to 2008. She is also a former Deputy Minister of Women, Family and Community Development.

Education
Chew received her secondary education at Kuen Cheng High School before going on to receive a Bachelor of Arts (BA) in Literature from the National Chengchi University in Taipei and a Master of Arts (MA) in Chinese Studies from the Universiti Tunku Abdul Rahman. She is currently pursuing a doctorate (PhD) at Peking University.

Political career
Chew began her political career after joining the Raub MCA Woman's Youth (Beliawanis) Section and served as private secretary to former Raub MP Teng Gaik Kwan in 1995. She contested and was elected twice for the parliamentary seat of Petaling Jaya Utara in Selangor in the 1999 and 2004 general election. She was appointed as Deputy Minister of Women, Family and Community Development by the 6th Prime Minister of Malaysia, Najib Razak on 9 April 2009 in Putrajaya. She was sworn-in before the Yang di-Pertuan Agong, Mizan Zainal Abidin, at the Istana Negara on 10 April 2009. She was appointed a Senator after failing to defend her parliamentary seat in the 2008 general election.

On 8 April 2010, Chew resigned as MCA Women Chief and deputy minister. Prior to this, on 28 March 2010, during the 2010 MCA election, she had pledged to resign from all her posts if MCA delegates still voted for Dr. Chua Soi Lek who was involved with DVD sex scandals as president. However, Chua eventually defeated Ong Tee Keat and Ong Ka Ting with a slim majority, leading to many to call for Chew to honour her pledge. Many of her followers at Wisma MCA carried banners reading "Holding the principle for the honor of women", "We support you", "We need you" and "Do not resign!". She was then dropped by MCA as a candidate in the 2013 general election.

Chew was selected as Barisan Nasional (BN) candidate in the 2014 Kajang by-election of the Selangor State Legislative Assembly seat following the events of the Kajang Move. However, she lost to Wan Azizah Wan Ismail of the People's Justice Party (PKR) by 5,379 votes. Prior to returning to her former office as deputy minister in 2014, Chew was again sworn-in as a Senator. But she resigned as a Senator on 27 June 2017 to focus on MCA duties.

In the 2018 general election, Chew contested the Raub parliamentary constituency in Pahang, but lost to Pakatan Harapan (PH)'s Tengku Zulpuri Shah Raja Puji of Democratic Action Party (DAP) in a three-corner fight with Pan-Malaysian Islamic Party (PAS). After Wee Ka Siong was elected as the 11th President of MCA in 2018 MCA election, he selected Chew to become the new and first female MCA Secretary-General. On 13 July 2019, Chew tendered her resignation from the office, effective 20 July 2019, to pursue a PhD in Peking University.

Controversies
In September 2017, DAP lawmakers questioned the MCA of Selangor about a one-acre plot of land in Kampung Cempaka, Petaling Jaya which was allegedly purchased under market price. MCA had applied for the land in 2006 and got approval from the state government in 2007 which was then under Barisan Nasional and Chew was still the MP of Petaling Jaya Utara. MCA then bought the land at RM 52,000 in 2008 at RM 1 per square foot (psf), when the land, in fact, was worth more than RM400 psf. It was later discovered by Yeo Bee Yin, the Selangor state assemblywoman (MLA) for Damansara Utama of DAP then that the MCA's plans to convert the land to commercial status earlier in the year and how MCA managed to purchase the land under market price were in questions. Chew denied being involved in the land application and declined to elaborate further. She later threatened to sue Yeo and the new DAP MP for Petaling Jaya Utara then, Tony Pua of defamatory for revealing the matter, which never took place.

Election results

Awards
 'The Outstanding Young Malaysian' by JCI Malaysia (2004)
 'Outstanding Alumni of Malaysia' by National Chengchi University (2006)

Honours

Honour of Malaysia
  :
  Knight Companion of the Order of Sultan Sharafuddin Idris Shah (DSIS) – Datin Paduka (2005)

See also
 Petaling Jaya Utara (federal constituency)

References

Living people
1964 births
People from Penang
Malaysian politicians of Chinese descent
Malaysian Chinese Association politicians
Members of the Dewan Rakyat
Members of the Dewan Negara
Women members of the Dewan Negara
National Chengchi University alumni
21st-century Malaysian politicians
21st-century Malaysian women politicians